Marek Hamšík (born 27 July 1987) is a Slovak professional footballer who plays as a midfielder for Süper Lig club Trabzonspor. He formerly captained the Slovakia national team.

After beginning his club career with Slovan Bratislava in 2004, Hamšík moved to Italian club Brescia later that year. In 2007, he was purchased by newly promoted Serie A club Napoli, where he became a mainstay in the squad's starting line-up. His energy, leadership, creativity, skill and eye for goal from midfield saw him play a key role in helping the team to two Coppa Italia titles, a Supercoppa Italiana, UEFA Champions League qualification and the 2014–15 UEFA Europa League semi-finals. He scored 121 goals for the club and collected 521 appearances in all competitions during his 12 seasons with the team, and also served as the club's captain between 2014 and 2019; he became the club's all-time top goalscorer in 2017 (surpassed by Dries Mertens in 2020), and the club's all-time appearance holder in 2018. In February 2019, he joined Chinese club Dalian Professional.

At international level, Hamšík helped Slovakia qualify for the country' first ever FIFA World Cup, captaining the side at the 2010 tournament as they reached the round of 16 following a victory over defending champions Italy. He would go on to lead his nation to European Championship qualification for the first time in 2016, as they once again reached the second round of a major tournament; a second consecutive European Championship appearance would follow for Hamšík in 2020. From 2007 to 2022, Hamšík collected 136 international caps at senior level, scoring 26 goals, and in 2018 became Slovakia's most capped player ever. In 2019, he scored his 25th international goal, overtaking Róbert Vittek as the nation's all-time top scorer.

For his performances, Hamšík has also won several individual awards: he is an eight-time winner of the Slovak Footballer of the Year Award, and he was named Serie A Young Footballer of the Year in 2008. In 2011, 2016 and 2017, he was named to the Serie A Team of the Year, and in 2015, he was included in the UEFA Europa League Squad of the season. In 2013, Hamšík was ranked as the eighth best footballer in Europe by Bloomberg.

Club career

Early career
Despite the fact Hamšík grew up in Banská Bystrica, he never played for major local team Dukla Banská Bystrica. Instead, he began playing for a small youth team, Jupie Podlavice. In 2002, he signed with top Slovak club Slovan Bratislava. He played six times for the Slovan Bratislava first team and scored one goal.

In 2004, at age 17, Hamšík joined Italian Serie A club Brescia for a €500,000 transfer fee. He made his Brescia debut in a 3–1 away defeat against Chievo on 20 March 2005, when he was 17 years and 237 days old. Later that season, Brescia finished 19th in Serie A and was therefore relegated to the Serie B. In 2005–06, he played 24 league matches for Brescia, with Brescia finishing tenth. He had an impressive 2006–07 season, scoring 10 goals in 40 matches.

Napoli

On 28 June 2007, newly promoted Serie A club Napoli announced Hamšík had signed a five-year contract with the club after Napoli paid Brescia a €5.5 million transfer fee. Napoli club chairman Aurelio De Laurentiis described Hamšík as a player who should be closely watched in the future.

Hamšík played his first competitive match with Napoli on 15 August 2007, against Cesena in the first round of the Coppa Italia; Napoli won the match 4–0, as Hamšík set up the opening goal and scored the second himself. He scored his first goal in Serie A on 16 September 2007 in the match against Sampdoria.

His football icon is Czech midfielder Pavel Nedvěd, to whom Hamšík has often been compared due to his playing style. In 2007, he was voted the second-best Slovak footballer of the year, after Martin Škrtel, and also he was voted the best young Slovak footballer (the Peter Dubovský Trophy). Hamšík ended his first season with Napoli as the club's top scorer, with nine goals from 37 matches. At the start of the 2008–09 season, Hamšík scored in both of Napoli's first two matches and went on to score a further nine goals in his second season with the club, finishing as Napoli's top scorer for the second-straight year.

In 2009, he was again runner-up as best Slovak footballer of the year and repeated his success as the best young Slovak footballer.

2010–11 season
On 19 September 2010, Hamšík scored Napoli's first goal as they came back from a goal down to defeat Sampdoria 2–1 in Genoa. On 23 September, Hamšík signed a three-year contract extension set to last until June 2015. Three days later, Hamšík scored his second goal of the new season with an 81st-minute penalty to earn Napoli a 4–1 comeback win away to newly promoted Cesena. On 30 January 2011, Hamšík scored a well taken effort as Napoli hammered Sampdoria 4–0.

The 2010–11 season was very productive for Hamšík, as he helped lead Napoli to a very successful season and earn automatic qualification into the UEFA Champions League by finishing third in Serie A. Hamšík played in 36 of Napoli's 38 Serie A matches that season, scoring 11 goals and contributing 6 assists.

2011–12 season
Hamšík scored the winning goal in Napoli's 2–0 home victory over Villarreal on 27 September, earning Napoli its first ever victory in the Champions League. On 29 November, Napoli welcomed Serie A table leaders Juventus to the Stadio San Paolo; Hamšík missed a 15th-minute penalty before heading in a goal to give the hosts the lead seven minutes later. The match was enthralling, however it ended in a 3–3 draw after Napoli conceded two late goals to preserve Juventus' unbeaten start to the season.

Hamšík provided an assist for Gökhan Inler's opening goal against Villarreal on 7 December and then scored the decisive goal, helping Napoli to a 2–0 victory in Spain. The win secured qualification to the round of 16 in a very difficult group, which included Bayern Munich and Manchester City. Hamšík helped Napoli finish the first half of the 2011–12 campaign on a high, scoring a superb goal in Napoli's 6–1 hammering of Genoa on 21 December. Hamšík also provided assists for strikes by Goran Pandev and Walter Gargano in the match. Through the first half of the 2011–12 campaign, Hamšík had appeared in 16 Serie A matches, contributing five goals and five assists. In Napoli's European campaign, Hamšík appeared in all six group stage matches and contributed two goals and one assist.

Following the winter break, Hamšík provided an assist for Edinson Cavani's goal and scored Napoli's third goal in its 3–1 defeat of Palermo on 8 January 2012. On 13 February 2012, he made his 200th appearance for Napoli in a 2–0 home win over Chievo.

On 9 March, Hamšík signed a one-year contract extension with Napoli, keeping him at the club until June 2016. The announcement was made following Hamšík scoring an incredible angled shot against Cagliari earlier that day, as Napoli ran out 6–3 winners. Hamšík's final goal of the season came in a 2–0 victory over Palermo on 1 May, as he doubled Napoli's lead in the 35th minute following a penalty from Edinson Cavani. Napoli finished the season in fifth place in Serie A, with Hamšík contributing nine league goals and nine assists.

Hamšík was also very influential as Napoli reached the Coppa Italia final against Scudetto winners Juventus on 20 May. After being slipped in by Goran Pandev, Hamšík was one-on-one with Juve goalkeeper Marco Storari and made no mistake as he touched it past the onrushing Storari, securing a 2–0 win which delivered The Partenopei its first trophy in over 20 years.

2012–13 season
Hamšík started in the 2012 Supercoppa Italiana, held in Beijing, on 11 August; however, Napoli were defeated by Juventus 4–2 in extra time. Later that month, in Napoli's first league fixture of the 2012–13 Serie A season, Hamšík scored the club's first goal and assisted Christian Maggio's strike in an eventual 3–0 defeat of Palermo. Missing leading goal-scorer Edinson Cavani for the club's match against Chievo on 28 October 2012, Hamšík connected on a Juan Camilo Zúñiga cross to give Napoli a 1–0 victory. On 6 January 2013, he made his 200th Serie A appearance in a 4–1 home win over Roma. On the penultimate matchday of the Serie A season, Hamšík collected a pass from Goran Pandev and nudged the ball home in the 93rd minute, rescuing a 2–1 win over Siena, confirming the club's place in the group stages of the Champions League while condemning Siena to relegation. The Slovak featured in every Serie A match for Napoli during the 2012–13 season, providing 11 goals and 14 assists as the Partenopei finished second behind reigning champions Juventus, a season which proved to be manager Walter Mazzarri's last at the club, as he became coach of Internazionale later that summer.

2013–14 season
On 10 August 2013, Hamšík signed a contract extension with Napoli, tying him to the club until the summer of 2018. In the first match of the 2013–14 Serie A season on 26 August 2013, Hamšík scored Napoli's second and third goals in the club's 3–0 home defeat of Bologna. Hamšík continued his scoring form in Napoli's following match, netting another brace in their 4–2 away victory over Chievo on 31 August.

Following Paolo Cannavaro's departure to Sassuolo in the 2014 January transfer window, Hamšík was named Napoli's new captain. On 27 April 2014, he made his 300th appearance for Napoli in a 0–0 draw against Internazionale. On 3 May 2014, Hamšík played 63 minutes in Napoli's 3–1 win over Fiorentina in the 2014 Coppa Italia Final.

2014–15 season
On 27 August 2014, Hamšík scored the opening goal, his first of the 2014–15 season, in the second leg of Napoli's Champions League play-off against Athletic Bilbao, as Bilbao came from behind to win the match 3–1 at home and eliminate Napoli from the competition. On 20 October, Hamšík scored the opening goal in a 2–0 away win over his former club Slovan Bratislava in Napoli's second group match of that season's UEFA Europa League, making his 40th appearance for the club in UEFA club competitions in the process and overtaking Antonio Juliano as the club's record appearance holder in European club competitions.

On 22 December, Hamšík lifted the 2014 Supercoppa Italiana as Napoli's captain, defeating Juventus 6–5 on penalties after a 2–2 draw following extra time. On 22 January 2015, he scored his first Coppa Italia goal of the season in the round of 16 against Udinese, as Napoli went on to win the match on penalties. On 3 May, he scored his 90th goal for Napoli in a 3–0 victory over Milan in Serie A.

2015–16 season
Under new Napoli manager Maurizio Sarri, Hamšík returned to playing as a central midfielder on the left in Napoli's three-man midfield for the 2015–16 season, which he described as being his preferred role. On 23 August 2015, Hamšík scored the opening goal in a 2–1 away defeat to Sassuolo on the opening match of the Serie A season. On 17 September, he scored in a 5–0 win over Club Brugge in the group stage of the Europa League. He made his 300th Serie A appearance on 6 January 2016, scoring in a 2–1 home win over Torino. In the following league match, on 10 January, he made his 300th Serie A appearance for Napoli in a 5–1 away win over Frosinone, as Napoli finished the first half of the season as unofficial "winter champions". He marked the occasion by scoring a goal, his 80th in Serie A, all of which were scored with Napoli.

2016–17 season
On 6 August 2016, Napoli announced Hamšík had signed a new four-year deal, keeping him at the club until 2020. On 24 September, he scored his 100th goal for the club in a 2–0 home win over Chievo in Serie A.

2017–18 season 
On 16 December 2017, Hamšík scored his 115th goal for Napoli in a 3–1 away victory over Torino, equalling Diego Maradona as the club's all-time top scorer. He surpassed Maradona's record one week later, becoming Napoli's outright all-time top goalscorer with his 116th goal for the club, which came in a 3–2 victory against Sampdoria in Naples. On 6 May 2018, he scored his 100th goal in Serie A (all of which came with Napoli) in a 2–2 home draw against Torino after coming off the bench.

2018–19 season 
On 23 September 2018, Hamšík made his 400th appearance in Serie A in a 3–1 away win over Torino. On 28 October, he made his 511th appearance for Napoli in a 1–1 home draw against Roma, equaling Giuseppe Bruscolotti as the club's record all-time appearance holder. On 6 November, he overtook Bruscolotti with his 512th appearance in all competitions for Napoli in a 1–1 home draw against Paris Saint-Germain in the Champions League.

Dalian Professional 
On 14 February 2019, he agreed a contract with Chinese club Dalian Professional (then Dalian Yifang) for a reported fee of €13 million, bringing to an end an eleven-and-a-half year spell with Napoli. On 3 March, in the opening match of the 2019 Chinese Super League season, Hamšík made his club debut in a 1–1 away draw against Henan Jianye. In 2020, it was reported he earned a weekly wage of about € 200 thousand. Earlier reports suggested an annual salary of about 9 million Euros.

IFK Göteborg 
On 8 March 2021, he signed as a free agent with Swedish club IFK Göteborg. After breaking the contract with his then club Dalian Professional, he sought his way back to Europe to get playtime before UEFA Euro 2020. He then turned to Allsvenskan, where the transfer window still was open, and signed for Göteborg until 30 August 2021. He made his debut for Göteborg on 19 April in a league game against AIK, replacing Simon Thern in the 73rd minute of a 2–0 win. He scored his first and only goal for the club on 17 May in a 2–2 draw with IK Sirius from a spectacular half-volley shot, which also won goal of the season in Allsvenskan.

Trabzonspor 
On 8 June 2021, it was announced he will join Turkish club Trabzonspor on a 2-year contract, effective from 1 July. Hamšík scored on his Süper Lig debut for the club, a 5–1 win over Yeni Malatyaspor on 16 August.

International career

Hamšík represented Slovakia at junior level, playing in the UEFA European Under-17 Championship qualifiers and the UEFA European Under-19 Championship. He played also for the Slovakia national under-21 team.

Hamšík was a regular member of the Slovakia national team. He made his debut on 7 February 2007 in a friendly against Poland, which ended in a 2–2 draw. He played his second match against Germany in the UEFA Euro 2008 qualification, which Slovakia lost 2–1. He became the key member of the attack for the national team, usually playing as a left or central attacking midfielder. Hamšík captained his country in its first FIFA World Cup experience in South Africa in 2010, where the nation made it to the first knockout stage after defeating then-world champions Italy 3–2. Slovakia was defeated by later finalists Netherlands in the first knockout stage.

Hamšík also played a key role in helping his nation qualify for Euro 2016 for the first time in the nation's history, finishing as Slovakia's top scorer as Slovakia placed second in its qualifying group behind defending champions Spain. Slovakia suffered a closely contested 2–1 defeat to Wales in its opening match of the competition on 11 June. Hamšík came close to opening the scoring in the third minute of play after dribbling past several Welsh defenders, but his strike was denied by Ben Davies' goal-line clearance. In Slovakia's second group B match of the tournament, against Russia on 15 June 2016, Hamšík set up a goal and later scored another himself in a 2–1 win, his nation's first in the competition. Following a 0–0 draw against England on 20 June, Slovakia advanced to the second round as the best third-placed team of the tournament. However, Slovakia was eliminated in the round of 16 on 26 June after a 3–0 defeat to reigning world champions Germany.

On 5 October 2017, Hamšík made his 100th appearance for the Slovak national team in a 0–1 loss to Scotland in a 2018 FIFA World Cup qualification match.

On 13 October 2018, Hamšík made his 108th international appearance in a 2–1 home defeat to Czech Republic in the UEFA Nations League; with this cap, he overtook Miroslav Karhan to become Slovakia's most capped player ever. He marked the occasion with a goal, his 22nd for his country, putting him equal with Szilárd Németh as his nation's second-highest goalscorer of all time, only behind Róbert Vittek with 23 goals.

In March 2019, after a surprise retirement of Martin Škrtel at the end of February, Hamšík regained the position of the captain of the national team, despite captaining the team some 20 times since 2010, most notably during the 2010 FIFA World Cup. In the previous years, Hamšík served as the vice-captain to Škrtel.

Retirement

Announcement
In May 2022, Hamšík announced his international retirement, capping a total of 135 matches and scoring 26 goals in them. He stated that his retirement is caused by increasing number of injuries he went through in preceding months and to spend more time with his family. Nonetheless, he stated he would wish to play in a final retirement match at home during the autumn of the year.

Farewell match
Hamšík was afforded this recognition on 20 November 2022 at Tehelné pole during an international friendly versus Chile. Earlier in the month, on 17 November, the national team also featured in another friendly at Podgorica City Stadium versus Montenegro. While Hamšík was a part of the squad for both fixtures, he did not appear in Podgorica, remaining out of the match nomination. The match against Montenegro concluded with a 2–2 tie.

For his retirement match versus Chile, on 17 November, Hamšík expressed that he hoped to fill up the Tehelné pole stadium. Prior to the match, he was praised by Francesco Calzona as being a "silent leader", recalling their period of coopeartion in Napoli. For the match, Hamšík had provided admission and transportation for the majority of youth players from his RSC Hamsik Academy. The caravan of 7 coaches and dozens of cars from Hamšík's native Banská Bystrica to Bratislava numbered over 500 people.

During the match, Hamšík, captained the team. Although it was expected that he was going to be subbed off earlier during the second half, Hamšík remained on the de facto for the entirety of the match only being replaced in the 89th minute of the match by Martin Regáli. Hamšík was exited by a standing ovation of almost 20 thousand spectators of an essentially sold out stadium. During the substitution he was reduced to tears reducing Calzona to tears in turn. In play, Hamšík continued to be a key player of Slovakia completing about 90 passes, with almost 90% accuracy with the media noting especially his cooperation with László Bénes. Repeatedly, fans have chanted his name and he was walked off through the walk of fame by his team-mates after the match. The match was also filled with numerous banner commemorations, social media interactions and 17th minute standing ovation as well as farewell messages from his relatives and previous managers including Ján Kocian, Ján Kozák and Vladimír Weiss.

After the match in press conferences and media appearances, Hamšík did not rule out the option to re-join the national team in a managerial or coaching positions in the future.

Style of play

Hamšík has been described as "quick, energetic, hard-working, and tactically versatile midfielder, who is capable of playing in several offensive positions on either side of the pitch, or even through the centre". Throughout his career, he has been deployed as a central midfielder, as an attacking midfielder, as a mezzala, as a winger, or even as a supporting striker or inside forward on occasion. Although naturally right footed, he is capable of striking the ball well with either foot, and is known for his ability to both score and create goals, often dropping deep to participate in the build-up of his team's plays, courtesy of his vision, passing, and crossing ability. A talented, elegant, and technically gifted advanced playmaker, in addition to his footballing skills, he is also known for his leadership and stamina, as well as his play, movement, creativity, and intelligence off the ball, in particular his ability to find spaces and make attacking runs to get into good positions in the opposition's half, and his tireless running. He is also capable of playing as a deep-lying playmaker or in a box-to-box role, due to his passing and tactical intelligence, and is an effective free kick and penalty taker, although his record from the penalty spot has been inconsistent at times throughout his career. Francesco Calzona, who crossed paths with Hamšík on club and international level, described him as an elegant and silent leader.

Other activities

Footballing activities
As early as 2013, Hamšík invested in FK Jupie Banská Bystrica - Podlavice, his youth club, renaming the club to Jupie Futbalová škola Mareka Hamšíka. In May 2022, while announcing his international retirement, Hamšík also announced the fusion of Jupie FŠMH and FK Rakytovce to form Rakytovce Sporting Club Hamsik Academy Banska Bystrica, with Rakytovce providing a 3. Liga senior side and Jupie FŠMH providing youth teams.

Business activities
Even during Hamšík's career in Napoli, Hamšík, in cooperation with his father Richard, began to develop his brand of wine assortments under the name Hamšík Winery. In 2021, Hamšík Winery broadened their business ventures into the beer industry, cooperating with Urpiner brewery from Hamšík's native Banská Bystrica.

Marketing and representative activities
Ahead of the 2010 FIFA World Cup, then 22-year-old Hamšík was featured in popular Slovak T-com ads featuring a South African child-fan name 'Dédé', played by Sithembele Jinghosa. The gimmick ad series was continued ahead of Christmas in 2010.

In 2015, Hamšík represented Slovakia and co-starred in events at the country's pavillion at Expo 2015 in Milan along with Slovak President Andrej Kiska.

Personal life
Hamšík is the son of Richard Hamšík and Renáta Hamšíková. In July 2014, Hamšík married Martina née Fraňová. The couple have three children - two sons named Christian (born 2010) and Lucas (born 2012), and a daughter named Melissa (born 2017). His sister Michaela is married to Uruguayan footballer Walter Gargano, Hamšík's former teammate at Napoli.

Career statistics

Club

International

Scores and results list Slovakia's goal tally first, score column indicates score after each Hamšík goal.

Honours
Napoli
Coppa Italia: 2011–12, 2013–14
Supercoppa Italiana: 2014

Trabzonspor
 Süper Lig: 2021–22
 Turkish Super Cup: 2022

Individual
 Serie A Young Footballer of the Year: 2008
 Serie A Team of the Year: 2010–11, 2015–16, 2016–17
 Most assists in Serie A: 2012–13, 2014–15
 Peter Dubovský Trophy: 2007, 2008
 Slovak Footballer of the Year: 2009, 2010, 2013, 2014, 2015, 2016, 2017, 2018
 UEFA Europa League Squad of the Season: 2014–15
Süper Lig Foreign Player the Year: 2021–22
Records
 Napoli all-time appearance holder: 520 appearances
 Slovakia all-time appearance holder: 126 appearances
 Slovakia all-time top scorer: 26 goals

See also
 List of top international men's football goalscorers by country
 List of men's footballers with 100 or more international caps

Notes

References

External links

Player profile on Napoli's official website

1987 births
Living people
Sportspeople from Banská Bystrica
Slovak footballers
Association football midfielders
ŠK Slovan Bratislava players
Brescia Calcio players
S.S.C. Napoli players
Dalian Professional F.C. players
IFK Göteborg players
Trabzonspor footballers
2. Liga (Slovakia) players
Serie A players
Serie B players
Chinese Super League players
Allsvenskan players
Süper Lig players
Slovakia youth international footballers
Slovakia under-21 international footballers
Slovakia international footballers
2010 FIFA World Cup players
UEFA Euro 2016 players
UEFA Euro 2020 players
FIFA Century Club
Slovak expatriate footballers
Slovak expatriate sportspeople in Italy
Slovak expatriate sportspeople in China
Slovak expatriate sportspeople in Sweden
Slovak expatriate sportspeople in Turkey
Expatriate footballers in Italy
Expatriate footballers in China
Expatriate footballers in Sweden
Expatriate footballers in Turkey